Sheng Kung Hui Tang Shiu Kin Secondary School ( was founded by Sheng Kung Hui, the Anglican church in the colony, in 1962. It is located at 9 Oi Kwan Road, Morrison Hill, Wan Chai, Hong Kong. It is one of the 114 English as the medium of instruction schools (EMI schools) in Hong Kong. It is also a Christian-based school. The principal

School history
The History Gallery was established in 2005. It comprises various zones - History of our School, Campus life in different decades, Collection of students' prizes and awards, Articles of old boys and girls. Through the display of photos and exhibits including school press and magazines, badges, graduates' magazines, old note books of students, the History Gallery outlined the historical development of our school vividly. Apart from permanent exhibition, special exhibitions are held regularly.  By preserving all treasurable pieces of the School in the History Gallery, we have captured the unique tradition and culture of the school, of which all students, alumni, teachers, parents, friends … can share the happy moments together.

Houses

Student–teacher ratio
Total Students: 1153（Including 1 foreign exchange student）

Teachers: 61

Student–teacher ratio: 1:19

Student Association
2003-2004 Voice
2004-2005 Fidelity
2005-2006 Triglot
2006-2007 Devote
2007-2008 NASA
2008-2009 Zenith
2009-2010 APEX
2010-2011 Nova
2011-2012 Meteor
2012-2013 Nebulas
2013-2014 Unity
2014-2015 Pioneer
2015-2016 Aorta
2016-2017 Delta
2017-2018 Innovator

Gallery

References

External links

Official site
Sport Federation Site
Sheng Kung Hui Tang Shiu Kin Campus TV
History Gallery of Sheng Kung Hui Tang Shiu Kin

Secondary schools in Hong Kong
Educational institutions established in 1962
Anglican schools in Hong Kong
Wan Chai
 Morrison Hill